William James O'Connor (born 15 July 1986 in Limerick) is an Irish professional darts player who competes in events of the Professional Darts Corporation (PDC).

Career

O'Connor first came to prominence in the 2010 UK Open when he defeated Stuart Monaghan in the First Round by 6 legs to 0. He then defeated Mark Frost and Peter Wright to reach the fourth round, where he played world number 3 James Wade on the main board and lost 9 legs to 3.

He qualified for the 2010 World Grand Prix, where he lost to Barrie Bates in the first round by 2 sets to 0.

O'Connor along with Mick McGowan represented Ireland at the inaugural PDC World Cup of Darts in 2010. The pair defeated Slovakia in the first round 6 legs to 3. However, they were narrowly beaten 6 legs to 5 in the second round to the Australian duo of Simon Whitlock and Paul Nicholson, who were number 4 and 16 in the world rankings respectively.

He played in his second World Cup for Ireland in 2012, again paired with McGowan and, as in 2010, they reached the second round this time by defeating Malaysia 5–2. They played the same Australian pair as in 2010 next and were whitewashed 0–4. The next week he reached the quarter-finals of the first UK Open Qualifier, but was defeated by Kevin Painter 4–6. This would later prove to be O'Connor's deepest run in a tournament in 2012. During the year he qualified for three of the five European Tour events. He was knocked out in the first round of the first two, but at the German Darts Masters he saw off Painter 6–5, before losing 3–6 to Wayne Jones. O'Connor was one of the two Irish qualifiers for the World Grand Prix and missed a dart for the match in the first round against Vincent van der Voort, losing 1–2 in sets.

O'Connor began 2013 ranked world number 54, and played in his third World Cup of Darts and first with Connie Finnan in February. 
The pair beat Denmark 5–0 in their first match and despite losing to South Africa 4–5 they finished top of Group B on leg difference to reach the last 16. They faced Japan and were defeated 3–5. O'Connor was beaten 9–4 by Dave Chisnall in the third round of the UK Open having earlier seen off Robbie Singleton and Johnny Haines. He struggled for form after this until the first weekend of November when he lost in the last 16 to Mensur Suljović and Gary Anderson in two Players Championships, earning himself £2,000 in the process.

O'Connor entered 2014 ranked world number 68, just outside the top 64 who had full playing privileges for the year ahead. He entered Q School and had his best result on the third day when he was defeated 5–0 by Pete Dyos in the last 16. The result helped him finish 24th on the Q School Order of Merit to claim the final place on offer for a two-year tour card. He was edged out in the third round of the UK Open 9–8 by Jamie Lewis. O'Connor and Finnan lost five successive legs in the first round of the World Cup of Darts to be beaten 5–3 by Singapore. He was knocked out in the first round of two European Tour events, before picking up his first victory of the season at the European Darts Trophy by averaging 104.36 in a 6–4 win over Mensur Suljović. In the second round, O'Connor was 5–4 ahead of Justin Pipe but bust his score when on 70 and missed one match dart at double six to be beaten 6–5.

At the 2015 UK Open, O'Connor overcame Dean Winstanley 5–3, Mark Webster 9–5 and Ian White 9–6 to reach the fifth round of the event for the first time where he played Stephen Bunting. The opening eight legs were shared, before Bunting took four of the next five and he went on to eliminate O'Connor 9–6. He saw off Ian White 6–1 and Vincent van der Voort 6–3 to reach his first quarter-final in three years and first in a European Tour event at the German Darts Masters. O'Connor led world number one Michael van Gerwen 3–1, but went on to lose 6–4 despite taking out three 100 plus finishes. O'Connor and Finnan's World Cup second round match with Hong Kong went to a doubles match which they lost 4–3. O'Connor was unable to advance past the first round of the World Grand Prix for the fourth time as he missed two match darts against Jamie Lewis.

O'Connor was beaten 6–5 by Jeffrey de Graaf in the second round of the UK Open. He ousted Tomas Seyler 6–3 and Kim Huybrechts 6–1 at the German Darts Masters, before losing 6–2 to Gary Anderson in the third round. O'Connor did not get past the last 64 of any individual event in the rest of the year. At the World Cup he and Mick McGowan squeezed past Hong Kong 5–4 in the first round, but they exited the tournament in the next round after they lost their singles matches to the Northern Irish team of Daryl Gurney and Brendan Dolan.

O'Connor just avoided having to enter Q School in 2017 as he was ranked 64th on the Order of Merit.

William kicked off 2017 when he defeated Max Hopp, Christian Kist, Keegan Brown, Ritchie Edhouse and Devon Peterson on the way to a quarter final in UK Open Qualifier 1. He eventually lost to Ricky Evans, but coupled with a run to the Last 32 in Qualifier 5, he did enough to make his way into the 2017 UK Open.

O'Connor entered the UK Open in the second round, where he took on fellow Irishman Steve Lennon. William got the better of Lennon 6–2 to book a spot in the Last 64. Here, he played Mick Todd, who O'Connor beat 10–3 over the longer format.  In the Last 32, he played Ronnie Baxter, with William claiming a super 10–6 win to reach his second ever UK Open Last 16. Simon Whitlock was his opponent, and the Aussie proved just too much, defeating O'Connor 10–7, although the Limerick man picked up £6,500 for his run.

O'Connor continued his form in Barnsley the following weekend, reaching the Last 16 of Players Championship 3, and the Last 32 of Players Championship 4. He defeated Zoran Lerchbacher and Christian Kist to set up a tie with the world champion Michael van Gerwen in the Last 32. O'Connor beat van Gerwen superbly 6–4, but lost to Ritchie Edhouse in the following round. In Players Championship 4 the next day, he dispatched of Jermaine Wattimena and Mick Todd, but was beaten by Mensur Suljović in the Last 32.

O'Connor had a couple of bad months, with his best result being a Last 32 in Players Championship 12, where he defeated Ronnie Baxter and Paul Harvey before a 6–5 loss to Steve Lennon. He once again teamed up with Mick McGowan at the World Cup of Darts.

O'Connor reached his first PDC final at the 2018 European Darts Matchplay, losing to Michael van Gerwen by a scoreline of 8–2. He then won a first PDC title at Players Championship 13 on 30 April 2019, beating Nathan Aspinall 8–4 in the final.

In June 2019, O'Connor alongside Steve Lennon made it all the way to the final of the 2019 PDC World Cup of Darts where they eventually lost to Scotland 3–1.

In the 2020 PDC World Championships, O'Connor made an apparent calculation blunder in losing his second round match against Gerwyn Price.

O'Connor was selected as a 'challenger' for the 2020 Premier League night in Dublin, Ireland.

World Championship results

PDC
 2018: First round (lost to Steve Beaton 1–3)
 2019: Third round (lost to Ryan Searle 1–4)
 2020: Second round (lost to Gerwyn Price 2–3)
 2021: Second round (lost to Daryl Gurney 2–3)
 2022: Third round (lost to Michael Smith 2–4)
 2023: Second round (lost to Gabriel Clemens 0–3)

Career finals

PDC team finals: 1 (1 runner-up)

Performance timeline

PDC European Tour

References

External links

1986 births
Living people
Irish darts players
Professional Darts Corporation current tour card holders
PDC ranking title winners
PDC World Cup of Darts Irish team